In 1854, Frenchman Eugene Lefaucheux introduced the Lefaucheux Model 1854, notable as being the first revolver to use self-contained metallic cartridges rather than loose powder, pistol ball, and percussion caps. The M1854 model was a single-action, pinfire revolver holding six rounds. It was a French military revolver chambered for the 12 mm pinfire cartridge, based on a design by Casimir Lefaucheux (Eugene's father, who was also a gun designer). The M1854 revolver spawned numerous variants, some of which were produced under license in other countries. It was widely exported during the 1860s and sold as both a military and civilian sidearm with either a short or long barrel. Most military models were produced only as single-action weapons, whereas civilian models were made primarily as double-action weapons.

Design

The revolver was a six-shot open-framed design, which was loaded via a hinged gate on the right side of the frame. Empty cartridges were also ejected through this gate via an ejector rod running along the barrel.

History

It was first fielded in the 1858 variation by the French Navy (designated as Lefaucheux de Marine mle 1858, or simply Lefaucheux M1858). The French Navy found the metallic cartridge to be useful at sea and in wet conditions, as pre-metallic paper cartridges suffered from moisture damage that often rendered them useless.

The M1854 model and variants were exported to many nations. Italy was the largest customer; it purchased over 27,000 revolvers to arm the Royal Carabinieri and other state police organizations, as well as some naval elements. Norway received 800 units in June 1860, and 1,100 in March 1864. Versions with an octagonal barrel were ordered in April 1864 and received in May 1864; Norway then obtained a license to produce its own. Turkey ordered a small amount in September 1864. Romania received about 2,000 in December 1864. The Swedish navy made numerous orders, receiving at least 2,130 units by February 1864, and continuing to order through 1866. Greece received 200 units in April 1861. Japan made two orders by 1862, but the amounts are unknown. The United States' Union Army and the Confederate States Army both ordered and received over 12,000 revolvers by January 1862.

Variants

There is often confusion about the Lefaucheux 1854 and 1858 models. The information in this entry refers to the M1854 and its variants made in France for others or made under license elsewhere. The M1854 was primarily in 12 mm pinfire but was also made in a 7 mm version by Escoffier in 1858 and patented with double action. A 9 mm version was designed in 1856 and available with either a rounded or an octagonal barrel. A version using center fire cartridges was eventually developed. Models were also purchased by Spain, Russia, Italy, and Norway and built under license. Spain was the first nation to do so, producing the 1858 "Officier" by Orbea Hermanos at Eibar and Trubia. Spain later made an 1863 model, also under license. After buying several thousand from France, Italy began producing some of its own at the Glisenti company in Brescia.

Norway purchased a license in 1864 and designed their own model which was accepted by their military as the M/1864. It produced about 1700 copies at Kongsberg Vapenfabrikk. In 1898, Norway converted their existing M/1864s to use center fire cartridges, designating the upgrade M/64/98. Norway's use of the Lefaucheux revolver was common up to 1920. In 1926, there were about 1371 models of all types in their inventory (M1854, M/1864, and M/64/98); they were withdrawn from service in 1931.

The American Civil War

Both the federal forces and the Confederate forces used Lefaucheux revolvers in the American Civil War. The Union Army typically issued them to cavalry soldiers, especially in the states of Illinois, Kansas, Kentucky, Missouri, and Wisconsin. Some of the models sold to the American powers kept the original designation, M1854, and were produced either at Lefaucheux Paris, Liege, or local producers under license (Chollet, Merton, Merton via Bond, Gunther at Liege). However, these pinfire revolvers were replaced in service later in the war as more Colt and Remington revolvers became available. Among American troops, the weapon was often referred to as the "French Tranter".

After the war many were sold back to France when it entered the Franco-Prussian war in 1870 and needed weapons. About 6,780 of the original 12,000 revolvers or so shipped to America were returned to France.

In Popular Culture

A Lefaucheux M1854 makes a brief appearance in For A Few Dollars More (1965), when The Prophet portrayed by Josef Egger demonstrates to Monco (Clint Eastwood) how Colonel Douglas Mortimer (Lee Van Cleef) carries his gun.

References

External links

Lefaucheux M 1854 revolver (infographic tech. drawing)
http://s144812367.onlinehome.fr (www.lefaucheux.net)

American Civil War weapons
Revolvers of France
Early revolvers
Black-powder pistols
Casimir Lefaucheux